= Mandawara, Rajasthan =

Village in India

Mandawara is located in Sapotra Tahsil of Karauli District in the State of Rajasthan in India. It comes under Sapotra Community Development Block. The nearest town is Karauli, which is about 19 kilometers away from Mandawara.

== Population ==
Mandawara is a village with a population of 3575, according to the Population Census of 2011. Out of the total population, 1929 are male while 1646 are female.

== Sex ratio ==
In Mandawara village, the population of children aged 0–6 is 508, which makes up 14.21% of the total population of the village, according to the Indian Census of 2011. The average sex ratio in the village is 853, which is lower than the Rajasthan state average of 928. Additionally, the child sex ratio for Mandawara is 764, which is also lower than the Rajasthan average of 888.
